James B Beard (September 24, 1935 – May 14, 2018) was an American agronomist.

Born in Piqua, Ohio to James Hart and Margaret Bashore Beard, James B Beard was raised in Bradford, Ohio. He began teaching at Michigan State University in 1961, and joined the Texas A&M University faculty in 1975. Over the course of his career, Beard was named a fellow of the Crop Science Society of America, American Society of Agronomy and the American Association for the Advancement of Science. He retired in 1992, and left his writings to Michigan State's Turfgrass Information Center in 2003. The next year, Purdue granted Beard an honorary doctorate in agriculture. In 2009, Beard received the Veitch Memorial Medal awarded by the Royal Horticultural Society, followed by the Crop Science Society of America Presidential Award in 2014. Beard died in Bryan, Texas, on May 14, 2018, aged 82.

References

1935 births
2018 deaths
American agronomists
People from Piqua, Ohio
People from Bradford, Ohio
Ohio State University College of Food, Agricultural, and Environmental Sciences alumni
Purdue University alumni
Michigan State University faculty
Texas A&M University faculty
Fellows of the American Association for the Advancement of Science
Veitch Memorial Medal recipients
People from Bryan, Texas